North Acton is a part of Acton in west London, and is within the London Borough of Ealing. It runs adjacent to the industrial district of Park Royal. Historically part of the Municipal Borough of Acton in the county of Middlesex, it has formed part of the London Borough of Ealing since 1965.

It is primarily within the London W3 postal district, although the northern, mainly industrial part of the area is covered by NW10 and overlaps with neighbouring Park Royal, essentially as a satellite region. Park Royal, which is heavily associated with North Acton, and forms part of the same ecclesiastical parish, falls under the NW10 postcode area. Its Church of England parish church is St Gabriel's Church, North Acton.

Commercial activity
The commercial district of Park Royal overspills into North Acton, and several facilities are located on the edge of North Acton Playing Fields, including the Black Island Film Studios. North Acton is also the home to the Boden clothes brand. In recent years there has been new commercial and high-rise residential redevelopment to the south of North Acton tube station, including extensive provision of student accommodation for the University of the Arts and Imperial College London.

BBC
The BBC has been associated with North Acton for many decades, with its main television rehearsal studios and its costume collection located in North Acton for many years in the late 20th century, adjacent to the railway station. There is a short and easy journey of just two stops on the Central line to reach White City and the BBC Television Centre there. Many famous actors and producers have utilised the rehearsal studios, and North Acton public house 'The Castle' opposite, where actors frequently gathered for lunch and refreshments. Following a decision by the BBC to relocate services, the rehearsal studios have closed, and the Television Centre itself also closed in 2013. The costume collection building has closed and been demolished with a new tower block of student accommodation (for the University of the Arts) opening on the site late in 2012. The student block has been named "The Costume Store" in tribute to the former BBC activity on the site.

The last remaining BBC facility in North Acton today is the "BBC Park Western" studios and office block, located on Kendall Avenue, beside the Central line, midway between North Acton and West Acton tube stations. Once the headquarters of the BBC TV Outside Broadcasting Department, half the site has now been sold and redeveloped, with the remaining BBC Park Western used as the operating base, standing set, and production offices for popular television series Silent Witness, much of which is filmed around Acton and Park Royal.

Public spaces

North Acton Playing Fields is a large open space for public recreation. Its facilities include several football and cricket pitches, multiple hard-surfaced and grass tennis courts, a basketball court, exercise machines forming a public 'outside gym', a pavilion, a children's playground, hard (tarmac) surfaced paths for walking in inclement weather, a picnic area with metal picnic tables, and designated dog-walking areas. In 2020, North Acton Square opened between Victoria Road and North Acton tube station, as part of a redevelopment of the area and to raise the profile of the transport hub.

Transport

Tube

The main tube station is North Acton Station (Central line), although several others are within easy walking distance of the community. The Piccadilly line also passes through the parish of North Acton, although with no station stop. North Acton station is on the border of fare zones 2 and 3. It is also the location of a junction (to the west of the station) where the Central line splits between its main line and the Ealing Broadway branch.

Buses

London Buses serving North Acton are:

Neighbouring places
 Park Royal
 Acton
 Ealing
 Shepherd's Bush
 Harlesden
 South Acton
 East Acton
 West Acton

References

Areas of London
Districts of the London Borough of Ealing
Acton, London